Impaled Nazarene is a Finnish extreme metal band that started as black metal but have incorporated elements of grindcore, thrash metal and death metal, and have grown more towards hardcore punk.

History
The band formed in November 1990, with founding members Mika Luttinen, Kimmo Luttinen, Mika Pääkkö, Ari Holappa and Antti Pihkala. The band gained national success when their debut album, Tol Cormpt Norz Norz Norz, entered the Finnish charts.

The band was infamous for their apparent hatred of the Norwegian black metal scene back the early 1990s; however, the band now seems to have disassociated themselves from that dislike. Luttinen later affirmed that "We have absolutely nothing against Norwegians. I even made up with Euronymous before he was killed so just forget this thing, it is ancient history".

Impaled Nazarene stopped wearing corpse paint in the mid-1990s when black metal exploded, with Luttinen explaining that "we felt it was time distance ourselves a bit from the ridiculous ideas and statements that were circulating around the whole scene back then. And look around, we are not alone who have done this. Even Norwegian bands have dropped paint and other shit and are concentrating on the music instead of childish statements".

With the release of Suomi Finland Perkele, Impaled Nazarene dropped some of their aggression and made a stylistic shift, but this direction ended with the removal of Kimmo Luttinen from the line-up. Mika Luttinen explained his dissatisfaction with Kimmo and how the band changed under his guidance:

After growing increasingly unpolished in delivery, the band made a shift, beginning with Nihil (2000) and the accession of Children of Bodom guitarist Alexi Laiho, towards a sound that has been described as "a benzedrine-fueled combination of thrash metal and Iron Maiden". Luttinen explained that Laiho's role was critical: "it was clear that now that we had finally two guitar players that we kind of like wanted to get away from that punky kind of writing style and started just wanting to get more back to the metal feeling".

Their ninth studio album, Pro Patria Finlandia, was a popular import album for Japan. Impaled Nazarene have toured with bands including Cannibal Corpse, Mayhem and Dark Tranquility, traversing four continents and over thirty countries.

On 16 March 2003, guitarist Teemu Raimoranta died falling off a bridge onto the ice below, in what was described as "an alcohol-related accidental fall".

On 15 January 22, the band announced that – after almost 15 years in the lineup – Tomi Ullgrén had left the band, citing busy work schedules that interfere with the band's rehearsal schdedule.

Lyrical content
For most of their history, Impaled Nazarene has focused on Finnish nationalism (for instance in their song "Total War - Winter War" about the Soviet-Finnish war in 1939 and 1940), and have demonstrated a strong anti-communist bent, as exemplified in their song "Healers of the Red Plague" on Rapture. Other lyrics revolve around war and Satanism. When asked about the hints of humour previously manifest in the lyrics, Luttinen affirmed that this was limited to Suomi Finland Perkele: "There will be no humour, we are not some fucking joke. If people find my lyrics funny, then, well, something is most certainly wrong in their heads". The band has also maintained a tradition of including at least one song on every album which has the word "goat" in the title, which Luttinen considers a "trademark" of the band:

Impaled Nazarene's Nihil (2000) is the only album that has been subject to a ban. However, this has caused additional problems for the band as, according to Luttinen, "Somebody seem to have really something against us and unfortunately that somebody has power enough to get our shows cancelled". Luttinen has been critical of the performance bans that the band has suffered in Germany and Poland, which he made explicit in the lyrics for Manifest (2007). In response to a question about the lack of sexual themes on Manifest, Luttinen responded:

In June 2017 the hardcore festival Ieperfest in Ypres (Ieper), Belgium, removed Impaled Nazarene from the line up after threats of violence from protesters. The reason for the protest was the band's lyrics condoning homophobia and rape. The festival organizers issued the following statement:

Members
Current line-up
 Mika Luttinen - vocals (1990–present)
 Reima Kellokoski - drums (1995–present)
 Mikael "Arkki" Arnkil - bass (2000–present)
 Kim Lappalainen - guitar  (2022-present)
Former members
 Kimmo "Sir" Luttinen – drums (1990–1995), guitar (1992–1995)
 Antti Pihkala - bass (1990–1991)
 Ari Holappa – guitar (1990–1992)
 Mika Pääkkö – guitar (1990–1992)
 Harri Halonen – bass (1991–1992)
 Jarno Anttila – guitar (1992–2010)
 Taneli Jarva – bass (1992–1996)
 Jani Lehtosaari – bass (1996–2000)
 Alexi Laiho – guitar (1998–2000; died 2020)
 Teemu Raimoranta – guitar (2000–2003; died 2003)
 Tuomo "Tuomio" Louhio – guitar (2003–2007)
 Tomi "UG" Ullgrén - guitar (2007–2022)

Timeline

Discography

Albums
Studio albums
 Tol Cormpt Norz Norz Norz… (1993)
 Ugra-Karma (1993)
 Suomi Finland Perkele (1994)
 Latex Cult (1996)
 Rapture (1998)
 Nihil (2000)
 Absence of War Does Not Mean Peace (2001)
 All That You Fear (2003)
 Pro Patria Finlandia (2006)
 Manifest (2007)
 Road to the Octagon (2010)
 Vigorous and Liberating Death (2014)
 Eight Headed Serpent (2021)

Live albums
 Death Comes in 26 Carefully Selected Pieces (2005)

Compilation albums
 Decade of Decadence (2000)

Split albums
 Impaled Nazarene/Driller Killer (2000)

EPs
 Goat Perversion (1992)
 Enlightenment Process (2010)
 Die in Holland (2013)
 Morbid Fate (2017)
 Goat of Mendes (2021)

Demos
 Shemhamforash (1991)
 Taog Eht Fo Htao Eht (1991)
 Tol Cormpt Norz Norz Norz... (1992)

Singles
 Sadogoat (1992)
 Satanic Masowhore (1993)
 Motörpenis (1996)

DVDs
 1990–2012

References

External links 
 Impaled Nazarene on Myspace
Interview with Impaled Nazarene at Diabolical Conquest Webzine

Blackened death metal musical groups
Discrimination against LGBT people
Finnish nationalism
Finnish black metal musical groups
Finnish hardcore punk groups
Musical groups established in 1990
Musical quartets